Carapito is a freguesia in Aguiar da Beira Municipality, Guarda District, Portugal. The population in 2011 was 442, in an area of 17.26 km2. The Dolmen of Carapito I is located in this freguesia.

Demography

References 

Freguesias of Aguiar da Beira